The Bulgarian Professional Football League (Българска професионална футболна лига) or BPFL (БПФЛ) organizes the Bulgarian A Professional Football Group, Bulgarian B Professional Football Group and the Bulgarian Cup tournaments. It unifies the Bulgarian professional football clubs.

External links